The First National Bank of Morrilton is a historic commercial building at Broadway and Moose Streets in Morrilton, Arkansas.  It is a narrow five-story masonry building, occupying a prominent location at the city's main downtown intersection.  It was built in 1925 to a design by architect Charles L. Thompson, and has Classical Revival and Bungalow/Craftsman features.  The short Broadway Street facade features a recessed entrance with Classical features, while the upper floors are relatively unadorned red brick, with Craftsman motifs in tile around the top floor windows.

The building was listed on the National Register of Historic Places.

See also
National Register of Historic Places listings in Conway County, Arkansas

References

Bank buildings on the National Register of Historic Places in Arkansas
Neoclassical architecture in Arkansas
American Craftsman architecture in Arkansas
Bungalow architecture in Arkansas
Commercial buildings completed in 1925
Buildings and structures in Morrilton, Arkansas
National Register of Historic Places in Conway County, Arkansas
Individually listed contributing properties to historic districts on the National Register in Arkansas
1925 establishments in Arkansas